Maribel Perez Wadsworth is the president of the USA Today Network and publisher of USA Today newspaper.

References

Living people
USA Today people
Year of birth missing (living people)
Place of birth missing (living people)
American women editors
21st-century American newspaper editors
Women newspaper editors
21st-century American women